The FIVB Volleyball Men's Club World Championship is an international men's club volleyball competition organised by the Fédération Internationale de Volleyball (FIVB), the sport's global governing body. The competition was first contested in 1989 in Italy. It was not held between 1993 and 2008, but since 2009, the competition has been held every year, and has been hosted by Qatar and Brazil except in 2017 and 2018 where both hosted by Poland.

The current champions are Italy's Sir Safety Susa Perugia, who defeated another Italian club – Trentino Itas (3–1) in the final of the 2022, to win their first title in the competition. Italian teams have been the most successful, with eleven titles, and in all editions but 2015, at least one Italian team take part in the event.

Results summary

Results by confederation

Format
The competition formula of the FIVB Volleyball Men's Club World Championship has been constantly changed to fit the different number of teams that participate in each edition. 

In general, the format of the tournament involves eight teams competing for the title at venues within the host nation over a period of about one week; the winners of that year's AVC Club Volleyball Championship (Asia), African Clubs Championship (Africa), Men's South American Volleyball Club Championship (South America) and CEV Champions League (Europe), along with the host city's team and a nominated team from North America. The number of teams is increased through wild card invitees.

Prize Money
The total prize money for the tournament is over USD$350,000.

Medals summary

Medal table by club

Medal table by country

MVP by edition
1989 – None
1990 –  Claudio Galli (Gonzaga Milano)
1991 –  Karch Kiraly (Porto Ravenna)
1992 –  Lorenzo Bernardi (Treviso)
2009 –  Matey Kaziyski (Trentino)
2010 –  Osmany Juantorena (Trentino)
2011 –  Osmany Juantorena (Trentino)
2012 –  Osmany Juantorena (Trentino)
2013 –  Wallace de Souza (Sada Cruzeiro)
2014 –  Dmitry Muserskiy (Belogorie Belgorod)
2015 –  Yoandy Leal (Sada Cruzeiro)
2016 –  William Arjona (Sada Cruzeiro) 
2017 –  Osmany Juantorena (Lube Civitanova)
2018 –  Aaron Russell (Trentino)
2019 –  Bruno Rezende (Lube Civitanova)
2021 –  Miguel Ángel López (Sada Cruzeiro)
2022 –  Simone Giannelli (Sir Safety Perugia)

See also
Men's
 African Clubs Championship
 Asian Men's Club Volleyball Championship
 CEV Champions League
 CEV Challenge Cup
 CEV Cup
 Men's South American Volleyball Club Championship

Women's
 Asian Women's Club Volleyball Championship
 CEV Women's Champions League
 CEV Women's Cup
 CEV Women's Challenge Cup
 FIVB Volleyball Women's Club World Championship
 Women's African Clubs Championship
 Women's South American Volleyball Club Championship

Notes

References

External links
Fédération Internationale de Volleyball – official website
FIVB Volleyball Men's Club World Championship Honours (1989–2012)

 
International volleyball competitions
Volleyball

Club, Men's
Sports club competitions
Annual sporting events
Multi-national professional sports leagues